Isthmiella is a genus of fungi within the Rhytismataceae family. The genus contains four species.

References

External links
Isthmiella at Index Fungorum

Leotiomycetes